Titusville High School is part of the Brevard Public Schools System. It is located at 150 Terrier Trail South, Titusville, Florida.

History
In 1927, Titusville High School was founded at the current location, the first building devoted solely to high school classes in the city. The Spanish-style structure featured terrazzo floors, brick halls, an auditorium, cafeteria, a large second-floor library, and one-story wings housing industrial arts and home economics departments. Over the entrance was a bell tower, which was reproduced in smaller form as a monument when the building was demolished in 1972. None of the original structure remains.

The school was partially integrated in 1966, and fully integrated in 1967 with African-American students coming from the previously all-black school, the Andrew J. Gibson High School.

Campus
The campus contains several buildings: the two-story Dorothy S. Wise Instructional Building; the Science, Art, and Health Occupations Building; Fine and Performing Arts Buildings; Cafeteria, Gym, Media Center and Administrative offices.

A new football stadium was completed in mid-2007. Two buildings were constructed in 2008: An Administrative/Science/Freshman Center and a Performing Arts building.

Sports
Its primary sports rival is Astronaut High School.

State championships
Boys Cross Country State Champions 1968, 1971 and 1977
Football State Champions 1982 and 1983
Girls Bowling state champions 2014.
Girls [Volleyball] State Champions 1981 & 1983.

Notable alumni
 Joe DeForest (1983), former professional football player and college coach
Bernard Giles (drop out), American serial killer and rapist
Michaela Hahn (2011), former professional soccer player
J. T. Hassell (transferred), NFL safety for the New York Jets
 Charlie Huggins (1965), retired U.S. Army colonel, former president of the Alaska Senate
 John Jurasek (2015), YouTube personality, food critic and radio host
 Mitzi Kremer (1986), 1988 US Olympic swimming medalist
 Gerald White (1983), former professional football player
 Eugene M. Davis (1970), Actor

Notable faculty 

 Jack Wilson, two-time Florida state champion high school basketball coach & former Anderson University basketball player

Footnotes

External links

Brevard Public Schools
Buildings and structures in Titusville, Florida
High schools in Brevard County, Florida
Public high schools in Florida
Educational institutions established in 1927
1927 establishments in Florida